The ancient city of Shabwa (Ḥaḑramitic: , romanized: ,) was the capital of the Kingdom of Hadhramaut at the South Arabian region of the Arabian Peninsula. The ruins of the city are located in the north of modern Shabwah Governorate of the Republic of Yemen. Pliny the Elder and Strabo refer to the city as Sabota, formerly a royal city with multiple local temples.

History
Shabwa was first settled in 13th century BC, and was destroyed by the Himyarites at the end of the 3rd century AD.

Ruins

Within the walls of the city are the remains of:
 the royal palace named Shugair
 the temple of goddess Sian Dhu Aleen

See also
 Middle East

Yemen
 Shabwa Museum
 Ma'rib
 Shibam

References

External links
 Shibam / Shabwa

Archaeological sites in Yemen
Architecture of ancient Yemen
South Arabia